Sungai Buaya is a new township in Hulu Selangor district of Selangor, Malaysia. It is located near Rawang and can be accessed via the federal trunk road Federal Route 1208 after the Perodua car making plant. There is a Malay village located here on another road. It is a small village which is located near the outskirts of Rawang. Sungai Buaya is divided in two places which are known as Kampung Sungai Buaya and Bandar Sungai Buaya.

Sungai Buaya gets its name from the legend of a white crocodile who is said to have lived there and witnessed by Sungai Buaya settlers.

Townships in Selangor